Cinnamodendron venezuelense is a species of flowering plant in the family Canellaceae. It is found in the state of Monagas in Venezuela.

References 
	

venezuelense
Plants described in 1952